Wrestling was one of the many sports which was held at the 1998 Asian Games in Bangkok, Thailand between 12 and 18 December 1998. The competition took place at Thammasat Gymnasium 1.

Schedule

Medalists

Freestyle

Greco-Roman

Medal table

Participating nations
A total of 175 athletes from 20 nations competed in wrestling at the 1998 Asian Games:

References
 Results
 FILA Database

 
1998 Asian Games events
1998
Asian Games
1998 Asian Games